The Tulsa Roughnecks (1978–1984) were a North American Soccer League (NASL) team from Tulsa, Oklahoma. It played its home games at Skelly Stadium on the campus of the University of Tulsa. The team, previously Team Hawaii, moved to Tulsa after the 1977 season. In 1983, Alex Skotarek became general manager and led one of the lowest-budgeted teams in the NASL to a championship, defeating Toronto, 2-0, at Soccer Bowl '83.

Shortly after the Tulsa Roughnecks victory of the 1983 Soccer Bowl, President Ronald Reagan sent congratulatory remarks to the team as they carried the trophy in a celebration parade through downtown Tulsa. The Roughnecks still stands (as of 2022) as the only major professional team from Oklahoma to win a championship.

Highlights
The Roughnecks first match was a 6–5 indoor loss on February 11, 1978, at the Bayfront Center versus the Tampa Bay Rowdies. Three nights later in their home debut, the same two teams faced off in front of the first 3,250 Roughnecks fans at the Tulsa Assembly Center. A few weeks later they would capture the Skelly Indoor Invitational which they hosted. Over the years Tulsa regularly appeared in the NASL playoffs. They won the NASL title in Soccer Bowl '83, defeating the Toronto Blizzard at BC Place Stadium (Vancouver) by a score of 2–0 before a paid attendance of 60,051. The team's all-time win–loss record was 104–106.  The Roughnecks' home games consistently drew better-than-league-average attendance with the annual record occurring during the 1980 season when the team averaged 19,787 spectators over 16 games for a total attendance that year of 316,593 (placing the Roughnecks at No. 5 between the Seattle Sounders and the Washington Diplomats).  The largest home game attendance for Tulsa occurred on April 26, 1980, when 30,822 fans watched the Roughnecks' 2–1 victory over the New York Cosmos at Skelly Stadium. The highest attendance for any Roughneck game occurred on August 26, 1979, when Tulsa met the Cosmos in New York for a NASL playoff game before a crowd of 76,031.

Post-NASL
Although the NASL's final season was 1984, and the league folded in early 1985, the Roughnecks continued to operate as an independent club. They had put together an ambitious schedule of more than 20 matches stretching from May into August, against teams from the USL, MISL, WACS, Europe, and South America, as well as other former NASL sides that had not folded. Excluding several cancelations along the way, the team compiled a record of 8–2–1, before suspending operations on July 17, 1985.

Famous Roughnecks players include Iraj Danaeifard, Alex Skotarek, Charlie Mitchell, Billy Caskey, Victor Moreland, Barry Wallace, Alan Woodward, Zeljko Bilecki, Carmelo D'Anzi, Winston DuBose, Njego Pesa, Laurie Abrahams, Chance Fry, Terry Moore and David McCreery.

Year-by-year

Honors

NASL championships (2)
 1983
 1978 indoor tournament

Division Champions (1)
 1983 Southern Division

Rookie of the Year
 1981 Joe Morrone, Jr.

Soccer Bowl MVP
 1983 Njego Pesa

Indoor Tournament MVP
 1978 Nino Zec & Tibor Molnar
 1983 Laurie Abrahams (offensive)

Indoor Leading Goal Scorer
 1978 Nino Zec & Milan Dovedan  (5 goals)
 1983 Laurie Abrahams (12 goals)

Indoor Leading Scorer
 1978 Nino Zec  (5 goals, 2 assists, 12 points)
 1983 Laurie Abrahams (12 goals, 6 assists, 30 points)

Indoor Assists Leader
 1979–80 Steve Earle (18 assists)

All-Star first team selections
 1983 Barry Wallace

All-Star second team selections
 1981 Barry Wallace
 1982 Barry Wallace
 1984 Terry Moore & Victor Moreland

All-Star honorable mentions
 1981 Duncan McKenzie
 1982 Laurie Abrahams
 1984 Ron Futcher

Indoor All-Tournament Team
 1978 Nino Zec, Milan Dovedan, Tibor Molnar, Gary Allison

Indoor All-Stars
 1981–82 Barry Wallace
 1983–84 Barry Wallace (starter) & Zequinha (reserve)

Canadian Soccer Hall of Fame
 2004 Bob Bolitho
 2005 Terry Moore
 2008 Jack Brand

Indoor Soccer Hall of Fame
 2012 Kim Roentved

Ownership & Staff
 Carl Moore – Co-Owner (1978–83)
 Mike Kimbrel – Co-Owner (1978–83)
 Rick Lowenherz – Co-Owner (1978–83)
 Fred Williams – Co-Owner (1978–83)
 Jim Boeh – Communications Director
 Noel Lemon – General Manager (1978–1981
 Alex Skotarek – General Manager (1983)
 Tulsa Cable – Owner (1984)

Players

 Zequinha (1983–84)
  Željko Bilecki (1981–82)
 Bob Bolitho (1980–81)
  Jack Brand (1979)
 Dean DiTocco (1978–80)
 Terry Moore (1982–84)
 Kim Roentved (1982)
 Laurie Abrahams (1979, 1982–83)
 Colin Boulton (1978–79) 
 David Bradford (1982/1984)
 Viv Busby (1981–82)
 Chris Dangerfield (1978)
 Terry Darracott (1979) 
 Roger Davies (1979)
 Alan Dugdale (1980–81)
 Steve Earle (1978/1980)
 Lil Fuccillo (1983)
 Ron Futcher (1983–84)
 David Irving (1980) 
 David Johnson (1984)
 Jimmy Kelly (1980–81)
 Duncan McKenzie (1981)
 David Nish (1979)
 Tommy Ord (1980)
 Colin Waldron (1978) 
 Barry Wallace (1980–85) 
 Alan Woodward (1979–81) 
 Franz Gerber (1982)
 Johannes Edvaldsson (1980–81)
 Iraj Danaeifard (1980–85)
 Don O'Riordan (1979–80)
 Carmelo D'Anzi (1983)
 Thompson Usiyan (1983–84)
 Billy Caskey (1978–85)
 David McCreery (1981–82)
 Chris McGrath (1981–82)
 Victor Moreland (1978; 1980–85)
 Adam Krupa (1981–85)
 Charlie Mitchell (1978)
 Davie Robb (1980) 
 Eric Robertson (1980)
 Delroy Allen (1980–82)
 Matt Bahr (1978)
 Winston DuBose (1982–85)
 Gene DuChateau (1979–81)
 Chance Fry (1983–85)
 Billy Gazonas (1978–1980)
 Joe Morrone, Jr. (1981–1982)
  Njego Pesa (1982–83)
 Bill Sautter (1978–79)
 Alex Skotarek (1978–81)
 Brian Shugart
 Ron Davies (1979)
 Clive Griffiths (1980)
 Wayne Hughes (1979)
 Petar Nikezić (1978)
 Nino Zec (1978, 1983–84)

Many former players have found employment as paid trainers of youth soccer teams for clubs such as the Tulsa United, Tulsa Soccer Club (TSC), Tornado Soccer Club, and Hurricane Football Club (HFC).

Coaches
 Bill Foulkes (1978)
  Alex Skotarek (1978)
 Alan Hinton (1979)
 Charlie Mitchell (1980–1981)
 Terry Hennessey (1981–1983, won 1983 Soccer Bowl)
 Steve Earle (1983–84 indoor season only)
 Wim Suurbier (1984)

External links
Jimmie Tramel, "Roughnecks a colorful, talented group", Tulsa World, June 26, 2006.
J Hutcherson, "Tulsa's Charity Case" at USSoccerPlayers.com.
Clive Gammon, "Blowing Out the Blizzard", October 10, 1983.
"Sports People; Too Rough In Tulsa", New York Times, November 17, 1983.

See also
San Antonio Thunder
Team Hawaii
Tulsa Renegades
Tulsa Roughnecks (1993–2000)
Tulsa Tornados

References

 
Association football clubs established in 1977
Association football clubs disestablished in 1985
Sports in Tulsa, Oklahoma
North American Soccer League (1968–1984) teams
Defunct indoor soccer clubs in the United States
Defunct soccer clubs in Oklahoma
Soccer clubs in Oklahoma
1977 establishments in Oklahoma
1985 disestablishments in Oklahoma